Crisant Bosch Espín (26 December 1907 – 13 April 1981), was a Spanish footballer who played as a midfielder for RCD Espanyol, Terrassa and Spain.

Honours

Catalan football championship: 4
 1928/29, 1932/33, 1936/37, 1939/40
Copa del Rey: 2
 1929, 1940

External links
 Spain stats

1907 births
1981 deaths
RCD Espanyol footballers
La Liga players
Footballers from Barcelona
Spanish footballers
Spain international footballers
Spanish football managers
RCD Espanyol managers
1934 FIFA World Cup players
Terrassa FC footballers
Association football midfielders
Catalonia international footballers